Maria Velten (1916 – 2008) was a German serial killer, who was sentenced to life imprisonment for three murders. Maria Velten died in 2008 in a nursing home after having been released from prison for health reasons.

Velten was a war widow with six children, two of them conceived after the war. In 1983, she was arrested after one of her daughters-in-law told her lawyer that her mother-in-law had poisoned her two husbands. Following investigations by the police revealed that Velten had killed in about 20 years - from 1963 to 1982 - a total of five people: her father, an aunt, two husbands and a partner. She mixed parathion with bilberry pudding, as the color of the pudding covered the blue warning color of the poison. Therefore, she was referred to in the tabloid press as "Bilberry Mariechen" and "The Poison Witch from Lower Rhine".

Maria Velten killed mainly for financial reasons; however, most of the time she did not spend on herself, but gave it to her children and grandchildren.

In 2009, a documentary about Velten was broadcast on German television (ARD). The accompanying text from the film states:

The case was also featured in a RTL series Anwälte der Toten.

Film 
 ARD: The Bilberry Mariechen. Documentary by Ute Bönnen and Gerald Endres. (2009)

External links 
 Tobias Dupke: Poisoner on TV; RP Online, January 24, 2009
 Manuscript for the Documentary film The Bilberry Mariechen (PDF-Datei; 83 kB)

See also
 List of German serial killers

Notes and references 

1916 births
1963 murders in Germany
1982 murders in Germany
1950s murders in Germany 
1960s murders in Germany 
1970s murders in Germany 
1980s murders in Germany 
2008 deaths
Criminals from North Rhine-Westphalia
German female serial killers
Mariticides
Patricides
People from Viersen (district)
Poisoners